Lincolnia is a census-designated place (CDP) in Fairfax County, Virginia, United States. The population was 22,828 at the 2010 census, an increase of over 44% from 2000.

Geography
Lincolnia is located in eastern Fairfax County at  (38.8184, -77.1433). It is bordered to the east by the city of Alexandria, to the south by Franconia, to the southwest by Springfield, to the west by Annandale, to the northwest by Lake Barcroft, and to the northeast by Bailey's Crossroads. Interstate 395 passes through the southern part of the CDP, with access from Exit 2 (Edsall Road), and Virginia State Route 236 (Little River Turnpike) passes through the center of the CDP. I-395 leads northeast  into the District of Columbia, while VA 236 leads east  to Old Town Alexandria and west  to Fairfax.

The CDP border follows Columbia Pike and Holmes Run to the north, its border with the city of Alexandria to the east, Interstate 395, Interstate 495, and the VRE Fredericksburg Line to the south, and Edsall Road, Clifton Street, Braddock Road, and Little River Turnpike to the west.

Demographics

As of the census of 2000, there were 15,788 people, 5,166 households, and 3,704 families residing in the CDP. The racial makeup of the CDP was 47.62% White, 18.82% African American, 0.22% Native American, 15.01% Asian, 0.02% Pacific Islander, 11.48% from other races, and 6.83% from two or more races. Hispanic or Latino of any race were 22.37% of the population. Lincolnia is the most diverse area in Fairfax County.

There were 5,166 households, out of which 36.7% had children under the age of 18 living with them, 54.7% were married couples living together, 10.8% had a female householder with no husband present, and 28.3% were non-families. 20.2% of all households were made up of individuals, and 4.8% had someone living alone who was 65 years of age or older. The average household size was 3.03 and the average family size was 3.45.

In the CDP, the population was spread out, with 25.3% under the age of 18, 9.9% from 18 to 24, 35.3% from 25 to 44, 21.6% from 45 to 64, and 7.9% who were 65 years of age or older. The median age was 33 years. For every 100 females there were 104.0 males. For every 100 females age 18 and over, there were 102.2 males.

The median income for a household in the CDP was $64,148, and the median income for a family was $65,601. Males had a median income of $39,146 versus $35,398 for females. The per capita income for the CDP was $26,876. About 7.9% of families and 11.8% of the population were below the poverty line, including 16.2% of those under age 18 and 9.5% of those age 65 or over.

History

Originally created following the Civil War as a community of freed slaves, Lincolnia remained as one of Fairfax County's original communities of African Americans for over 100 years. During segregation, Lincolnia had its own schoolhouse. The historical structure is still standing, now incorporated into Lincolnia Senior Center.
The school became integrated in 1962 as part of court-ordered busing. The African American students were bused out and white students were bused in.

See also
Virginia State Route 613 (Fairfax County) (Lincolnia Road)

References

Census-designated places in Virginia
Census-designated places in Fairfax County, Virginia
Washington metropolitan area